Homeobox protein MSX-1, is a protein that in humans is encoded by the MSX1 gene. MSX1 transcripts are not only found in thyrotrope-derived TSH cells, but also in the TtT97 thyrotropic tumor, which is a well differentiated hyperplastic tissue that produces both TSHß- and a-subunits and is responsive to thyroid hormone. MSX1 is also expressed in highly differentiated pituitary cells which until recently was thought to be expressed exclusively during embryogenesis. There is a highly conserved structural organization of the members of the MSX family of genes and their abundant expression at sites of inductive cell–cell interactions in the embryo suggest that they have a pivotal role during early development.

Function 
This gene encodes a member of the muscle segment homeobox gene family. The encoded protein functions as a transcriptional repressor during embryogenesis through interactions with components of the core transcription complex and other homeoproteins. It may also have roles in limb-pattern formation, craniofacial development, in particular, odontogenesis, and tumor growth inhibition. There is also strong evidence from sequencing studies of candidate genes involved in clefting that mutations in the MSX1 gene may be associated in the pathogenesis of cleft lip and palate. Mutations in this gene, which was once known as homeobox 7, have also been associated with  Witkop syndrome, Wolf–Hirschhorn syndrome, and autosomal dominant hypodontia. Haploinsufficiency of MSX1 protein affects the development of all teeth, preferentially third molars and second premolars. The effect of haploinsufficiency of PAX9 on the development of incisors and premolars is probably caused by a deficiency of MSX1 protein.

Phenotypes caused by deficiency of MSX1 protein might depend on the localization of mutations and their effect on the protein structure and function. Two substitution mutations, Arg196Pro and Met61Lys cause only familial non-syndromic tooth agenesis. Frameshift mutations, Ser202Stop mutation, resulting in a protein that lacks the C-terminal end of the homeodomain, impairs not only teeth but also nail formation, while Ser105Stop mutation, causing complete absence of the MSX1 homeodomain, is responsible for the most severe phenotype, which includes orofacial clefts with accompanied tooth agenesis.

MSX1 is one of the strongest candidate genes for specific forms of tooth agenesis, mutations in this gene was detected only in some affected individuals. Genes expressed in the early dental epithelium in mice such as Bmp4, Bmp7, Dlx2, Dlx5, Fgf1, Fgf2, Fgf4, Fgf8, Lef1, Gli2, and Gli3 are also potential candidates. Based on existing evidence, it seems possible that both hypodontia and oligodontia are heterogeneous traits, caused by several independent defective genes, which act along or in combination with other genes and lead to specific phenotypes.

MSX1 is found to have a linkage with Witkop syndrome, also known as “tooth and nail syndrome” or “nail dysgenesis and hypodontia” since mutations in MSX1 were shown to be associated with tooth agenesis. There is a linkage found between TNS and markers surrounding the MSX1 locus and it showed that a nonsense mutation (S202X) in MSX1 cosegregated with the TNS phenotype in a three-generation family.

Interactions 
MSX1 has been shown to interact with DLX5, CREB binding protein, Sp1 transcription factor, DLX2, TATA binding protein and Msh homeobox 2.

LHX2, a LIMtype homeoprotein, is a protein partner for MSX1 in vitro and in cellular extracts. The interaction between MSX1 and LHX2 is mediated through the homeodomain-containing regions of both proteins. MSX1 and LHX2 form a protein complex in the absence of DNA, and that DNA binding by either protein alone can occur at the expense of protein complex formation.

References

Further reading

External links 
 
 
 

Transcription factors